Kadaru Nagabhushanam or K. B. Nagabhushanam (1902 – 18 October 1976) was an Indian film director and producer in the 1940s to 1960s, working in Telugu and Tamil cinema. He was the husband of P. Kannamba. They established Rajarajeshwari Films and produced many mythological films starring Kannamba in the lead role including Harischandra. Their social film Navajeevanam on untouchability got the recognition of Madras State and was chosen as the best feature film.

Film career
Nagabhushanam entered the cinema field as producer of Talli Prema in 1941.  His directorial debut film was Sumati, which greatly attracted women. His magnum opus film Paduka Pattabhishekam (1945) starred C. S. R. Anjaneyulu, Addanki and Kannamba. He took special care of the clothing, ornaments and make-up, which is noticeable in every scene. Later, he produced Harischandra and Tulasi Jalandhara in Tamil language which were successful. He came back to Telugu with Saudamini (1951). His movie Peda Rytu (Poor farmer), a message based film on Agricultural laborers became a landmark film in Telugu film industry. It was remade into Tamil also. His movie Sati Sakkubai (1954) ran for 100 days in Andhra Pradesh theaters. His subsequent production was the popular Naga Panchami (1956) starring Anjali Devi and V. Nagayya. He also directed Sati Savitri of Varalakshmi Pictures in which S. V. Ranga Rao acted as Yama and shot into fame for his effective portrayal of the character. Subsequently, he made Sri Krishna Maya directed by C. S. Rao. His movie Dakshayagnam (1962) remembered as the film wherein N. T. Rama Rao portrayed as Lord Shiva for the first and last time. After the death of his wife Kannamba in 1964, he deteriorated mentally and physically. He had financial problems with the production of Tamil film starring M. G. Ramachandran. He sold his properties and had to live in poor conditions in Chennai, but was assisted by his professional colleagues for his livelihood. He died in 1976.

Filmography

References

External links
 

Film producers from Chennai
Film directors from Chennai
1902 births
1976 deaths
20th-century Indian male actors
Indian male film actors
Male actors in Tamil cinema
Male actors from Chennai
20th-century Indian film directors
Telugu film producers
Tamil film producers
Tamil film directors
Telugu film directors
20th-century Indian businesspeople
Male actors in Telugu cinema